Six Characters in Search of an Author is a 1963 television play broadcast by the Australian Broadcasting Corporation. It was directed by Christopher Muir. It is a production of the play by Luigi Pirandello.

Premise
The show was set in a TV studio during a rehearsal for a new costume serial. Six people arrive, each with a story to tell.

Cast
Lance Bennett as Fred Parslow
Cheryl Fisher as the daughter
Norman Kaye as the father
Patricia Kennedy as the mother		
Marea Letho as the step daughter
Michael Norman as the boy		
Terry Norris as Letho

Production
Some scenes were shot at Flinders St Station, Melbourne.

Reception
The Bulletin said it  "came   up   surprisingly   well."

The Sydney Morning Herald called it "a stimulating and dramatically rewarding effort."

References

External links

Australian television plays
Australian Broadcasting Corporation original programming
English-language television shows
Films based on works by Luigi Pirandello
1964 television plays
Films directed by Christopher Muir